Leonore Kirschstein (29 March 1933 – 26 February 2017) was a German soprano in opera and concert.

Born in Stettin (today Szczecin), Kirschstein received her training at the Robert Schumann Conservatory in Düsseldorf, where her instructor was Franziska Martienssen-Lohmann. Kirschstein began her career at the Städtische Oper Berlin in 1958, and from 1960 to 1963 she was on the roster of the Stadttheater Kiel; from 1965 to 1968 she was a member of the company at the Augsburg Opera. Beginning in 1968 Kirschstein was a regular member of the company at the Bavarian State Opera in Munich, where she had previously appeared as a guest artist, including Alice Ford in Verdi's Falstaff in 1966, conducted by Joseph Keilberth and alongside Dietrich Fischer-Dieskau as Falstaff. Among her roles in Munich was a part in the premiere of Isang Yun's Sin Tjong in 1972.

During her career she appeared at numerous international festivals. She sang at the Salzburg Festival the soprano part in Mozart's Requiem in 1961, and appeared there in 1970 as the First Lady in his Die Zauberflöte. She performed at the Edinburgh Festival in 1965 and 1971. Kirschstein was also active as a recitalist and oratorio singer.

Since her retirement from the stage, she had worked in Augsburg as a voice teacher. Her recordings include Mozart's Die Zauberflöte and Wagner's Lohengrin. She sang the soprano part in Helmuth Rilling's 1966 recording of Bach's drama per musica Schleicht, spielende Wellen, BWV 206, alongside Margarethe Bence, Kurt Equiluz and Erich Wenk. She appeared as Anna in a 1966 live recording of Marschner's Hans Heiling, with Hermann Prey in the title role and Liane Synek as Heiling's mother, and Joseph Keilberth conducting choir and orchestra of the WDR. She recorded Beethoven's Missa solemnis with Günter Wand conducting the chorus and orchestra of the Gürzenich in Cologne, alongside Jeanne Deroubaix, Peter Schreier and Günther Morbach. In 1968, she sang the part of the Cardillac's daughter in a recording of Hindemith's Cardillac, conducted by Keilberth, and with Dietrich Fischer-Dieskau in the title role.

References

External links 
 

1933 births
2017 deaths
German operatic sopranos
20th-century German women opera singers
Musicians from Szczecin
Robert Schumann Hochschule alumni